Bovington may refer to:

People 

 Edward Ernest Perrian Bovington (born 1941), football player, England
 Torchil de Bovington (11th-century), landowner, Norman England
 Victor Bovington (* 1903, date of death unknown), rower, United Kingdom

Locations 

 Bovington Camp, British Army military base, Dorset, England
 The Tank Museum, military museum, Bovington Camp, England

See also 

 Bovingdon (disambiguation)
 Boyington